The 2021 Atlantic hurricane season was the third-most active Atlantic hurricane season on record, producing 21 named storms and the second season in a row (third overall) in which the designated 21-name list of storm names was exhausted. It was also the most recent season with above-average tropical cyclone activity in terms of the number of named storms. Seven of those storms strengthened into a hurricane, four of which reached major hurricane intensity, which is just slightly above-average. The season officially began on June 1 and ended on November 30. These dates historically describe the period in each year when most Atlantic tropical cyclones form. However, subtropical or tropical cyclogenesis is possible at any time of the year, as demonstrated by Tropical Storm Ana's development on May 22, making this the seventh consecutive year in which a storm developed outside of the official season. That streak ended with the 2021 season, as there were no pre-season cyclones in the following season.

Three named storms formed in June, tying the record for the most to develop in that month. Among them was Tropical Storm Claudette, which brought flooding to portions of the Deep South. Then, on July 1, Elsa developed and became the earliest-forming fifth named storm on record surpassing Tropical Storm Edouard in 2020. The storm later caused significant impacts from Barbados to much of the East Coast of the United States, with about $1.2 billion in damage in the latter region. In August, Tropical Storm Fred flooded parts of the Caribbean and Southeastern United States, resulting in roughly $1.3 billion in damage. Hurricane Grace intensified to a Category 3 major hurricane before making landfall in the Mexican state of Veracruz, causing 17 deaths and about $513 million in damage in the Greater Antilles and Mexico. On August 22, Henri struck Rhode Island and brought flooding and high winds to the Northeastern United States, with damage estimated at $700 million.

Hurricane Ida became the deadliest and most destructive tropical cyclone of the season after striking southeastern Louisiana at Category 4 strength in late August, 16 years to the day after Hurricane Katrina decimated that same region. After devastating Louisiana and moving farther inland, Ida caused catastrophic flooding and spawned several destructive tornadoes across the Northeastern United States. Damage estimates from the storm exceeded $75 billion, contributing to over 93% of the total damage done in 2021 season. Additionally, Ida killed 107 people, directly or indirectly, throughout the impacted regions. In September, Hurricane Larry peaked as a powerful Category 3 hurricane over the open Atlantic before making landfall in the Canadian province of Newfoundland and Labrador as a Category 1 hurricane. Later in the month, Hurricane Nicholas moved erratically both on- and offshore the coasts of Texas and Louisiana. Freshwater flooding, coastal flooding, and winds generated by Nicholas left about $1 billion in damage. Hurricane Sam became the most intense system of the season, peaking as a strong Category 4 hurricane in late September. Tropical cyclones during this season collectively caused 194 deaths and nearly $81 billion in damage, making it the third-costliest season on record, behind 2005 and 2017.

Nearly all forecasting agencies predicted above-average activity during the season, due to expectations of abnormally warm sea surface temperatures, the unlikelihood of an El Niño, and the possibility of a La Niña. Although these forecasted conditions transpired during the season, the agencies slightly underestimated the number of named storms, but nearly all were fairly accurate with the number of hurricanes and major hurricanes. This season, the National Hurricane Center (NHC) began issuing regular Tropical Weather Outlooks on May 15, two weeks earlier than it has done in the past. The change was implemented given that named systems had formed in the Atlantic Ocean prior to the start of the season in each of the preceding six cycles. Prior to the start of the season, NOAA deployed five modified hurricane-class saildrones at key locations around the basin, and in September, one of the vessels was in position to obtain video and data from inside Hurricane Sam. It was the first-ever research vessel to venture inside the middle of a major hurricane.

Seasonal forecasts

In advance of, and during, each hurricane season, several forecasts of hurricane activity are issued by national meteorological services, scientific agencies, and noted hurricane experts. These include forecasters from the United States National Oceanic and Atmospheric Administration (NOAA)'s Climate Prediction Center, Tropical Storm Risk (TSR), the United Kingdom's Met Office (UKMO), and Philip J. Klotzbach, William M. Gray and their associates at Colorado State University (CSU). The forecasts discuss weekly and monthly changes in significant factors that help determine the number of tropical storms, hurricanes, and major hurricanes within a particular year. According to NOAA and CSU, the average Atlantic hurricane season between 1991 and 2020 contained roughly 14 tropical storms, seven hurricanes, three major hurricanes, and an accumulated cyclone energy (ACE) index of 72–111 units. Broadly speaking, ACE is a measure of the power of a tropical or subtropical storm multiplied by the length of time it existed. NOAA typically categorizes a season as above-average, average, or below-average based on the cumulative ACE index, but the number of tropical storms, hurricanes, and major hurricanes within a hurricane season is sometimes also considered.

Pre-season forecasts
On December 9, 2020, TSR issued an extended range forecast for the 2021 hurricane season, predicting slightly above-average activity with 16 named storms, 7 hurricanes, 3 major hurricanes, and an ACE index of about 127 units. TSR cited the expected development of a weak La Niña during the third quarter of 2021 as the main factor behind their forecast. CSU released their first predictions on April 8, 2021, predicting an above-average season with 17 named storms, 8 hurricanes, 4 major hurricanes, and an ACE index of 150 units, citing the unlikelihood of an El Niño and much warmer than average sea surface temperatures in the subtropical Atlantic. On the same day, Pennsylvania State University predicted 9–15 named storms, anticipating slightly above-average sea surface temperatures and a neutral El Niño–Southern Oscillation. TSR updated their forecast on April 13, with 17 named storms, 8 hurricanes, and 3 major hurricanes, with an ACE index of 134 units. On the same day, the University of Arizona (UA) issued its seasonal prediction of above-average hurricane activities, with 18 named storms, 8 hurricanes, 4 major hurricanes, and an ACE index of 137 units. North Carolina State University (NCSU) made its prediction for the season on April 14, calling for an above-average season with 15 to 18 named storms, 7 to 9 hurricanes, and 2 to 3 major hurricanes. The Weather Company (TWC) issued their first predictions on April 15, forecasting 18 named storms, 8 hurricanes, and 3 major hurricanes, citing warm sea surface temperatures, a La Niña, and other active seasons with similar atmospheric conditions.

On May 13, TWC updated their forecast for the season, calling for an active season, with 19 named storms, 8 hurricanes, and 4 major hurricanes. On May 20, NOAA's Climate Prediction Center issued their forecasts for the season, predicting a 60% chance of above-average activity and 30% chance for below-average activity, with 13–20 named storms, 6–10 hurricanes, and 3–5 major hurricanes. The same day, UKMO issued their own forecast for the 2021 season, predicting an average one with 14 named storms, 7 hurricanes, and 3 major hurricanes, with a 70% chance that each of these statistics will fall between 9 and 19, 4 and 10, and 1 and 5, respectively. TSR's third seasonal forecast, issued on May 27, predicted 18 named storms, 9 hurricanes, and 4 major hurricanes.

Mid-season forecasts
The second prediction by CSU, issued on June 3, increased the number of named storms to 18, while leaving the number of hurricanes and major hurricanes unchanged at 8 and 4, respectively. On June 16, UA updated their forecast for the season, with 19 named storms, 6 hurricanes, 4 major hurricanes, and an ACE index of 183 units. On July 6, TSR released their third forecast for the season, slightly increasing their numbers to 20 named storms, 9 hurricanes, and 4 major hurricanes. This prediction was largely based on their expectation for a weak La Niña to develop by the third quarter of the year. On July 8, CSU updated their prediction to 20 named storms, 9 hurricanes, and 4 major hurricanes. UKMO's updated forecast on August 2 called for 15 named storms, 6 hurricanes, and 3 major hurricanes. The second and final forecast by NOAA, issued on August 4, predicted 15 to 21 named storms, 7 to 10 hurricanes, and 3 to 5 major hurricanes. On August 5, CSU's final seasonal predictions decreased the number of named storms to 18 and hurricanes to 8, while the number of major hurricanes remained unchanged. TSR issued their final forecast for the season on the same day, lowering their numbers to 18 named storms, 7 hurricanes, and 3 major hurricanes.

Seasonal summary

The 2021 Atlantic hurricane season officially ran from June 1 to November 30. A total of 21 tropical depressions formed, all of which reached at least tropical or subtropical intensity. The season ranks as the third-most active of all time in the Atlantic basin, behind only 2005 and 2020. Consequently, the 2021 Atlantic hurricane season was the third on record to exhaust its naming list. Nine of the systems lasted for two days or less, tied with 2007 for the most since the NHC began monitoring subtropical systems in 1968. Although the season was highly active in terms of the number of named storms, seven of those tropical or subtropical systems intensified into a hurricane and four of those became a major hurricane, which is near-average and just slightly above-average, respectively. Nonetheless, 2021 marked the record sixth consecutive above-average season in the Atlantic. The ongoing warm Atlantic multidecadal oscillation, which began in 1995, contributed to the season's high level of activity, as it led to above-average sea surface temperatures in the Atlantic basin. Other factors included the presence of a La Niña and abnormally heavy West African Monsoon precipitation.

Collectively, the tropical and subtropical systems of the 2021 Atlantic hurricane season caused 194 deaths and about $80.727 billion in damage, making it the third costliest season on record. Eight named storms struck the United States, which is the third most ever, behind only the previous season and 1916. In conjunction with 2020, 19 systems of at least tropical storm intensity made landfall in the country during the two seasons, surpassing the record of 15 during the 2004 and 2005 seasons combined. As a result, some regions significantly impacted during the 2020 season were once again hit hard in 2021, especially eastern Louisiana and portions of the Northeastern United States. Rhode Island was struck by two tropical systems, Elsa and Henri, an unusual occurrence especially given that the state had recorded no landfalls since Bob in 1991. Four tropical cyclones or their remnantsElsa, Fred, Ida, and Nicholaseach caused at least $1 billion in damage in the United States.

The ACE index for the 2021 Atlantic hurricane season, as calculated by Colorado State University using data from the NHC, was approximately 146 units. Therefore, the ACE index value does not include tropical depressions. Each season dating back to 2016 recorded ACE index values exceeding 129, which senior research associate Brian McNoldy of the University of Miami described as "unprecedented even for four years, let alone six!"

Throughout the season, NOAA Hurricane Hunters logged 462.2 flight hours, conducting 58 eyewall passages and deploying 1,310 dropsondes in the process. NOAA also deployed 66 underwater gliders, which made 78,328 observations on oceanic salinity and temperatures. Additionally, NOAA used five unmanned saildrones to increase documentation on atmospheric and oceanic conditions across the Atlantic basin. One of the five saildrones became the first research vessel to ever enter a major hurricane when it reached Hurricane Sam on September 30.

Pre/early season activity

Tropical Storm Ana formed on May 22, making 2021 the seventh consecutive year in which a tropical or subtropical cyclone formed before the season's official start. Ana formed in a location where no tropical storms within the month of May had been documented since before 1950. In mid-June, a rapidly developing non-tropical low offshore of the North Carolina coast became Tropical Storm Bill. The system lasted for only two days before becoming extratropical. Later that month, Tropical Storm Claudette formed just off the coast of Louisiana and Tropical Storm Danny developed offshore South Carolina. Overall, June featured three named storms, tied with 1886, 1909, 1936, and 1968 for the most during that month. Elsa formed on June 30 and became a tropical storm on the following day, making it the earliest fifth-named storm on record, surpassing the previous record by five days, set by Tropical Storm Edouard in 2020. It soon became the first hurricane of the season before impacting the Caribbean and making landfall in Cuba. Later, Elsa brought impacts to the Eastern United States, striking Florida on July 7 and New York and Rhode Island on July 9. Thereafter, activity came to a monthlong halt due to unfavorable conditions across the basin.

On August 11, Fred formed in the eastern Caribbean, bringing impacts to the Greater and Lesser Antilles, and the Southeastern United States. A few days later, Grace formed and strengthened into the second hurricane and first major hurricane of the season, and brought impacts to the Greater Antilles and the Yucatán Peninsula, before making landfall in the Mexican state of Veracruz. A third tropical system, Henri, developed on August 16, near Bermuda. Henri meandered for several days before becoming the third hurricane of the season on August 21 and impacted New England, causing record flooding in some places. Towards the end of the month, Hurricane Ida formed, leaving major damage in western Cuba before rapidly intensifying into a Category 4 hurricane and making landfall in southeastern Louisiana at peak intensity, producing widespread, catastrophic damage. Its remnants then generated a deadly tornado outbreak and widespread, record-breaking flooding across the Northeastern United States. Two other tropical storms, Julian and Kate, also existed briefly during this time but remained at sea. Larry formed on the last day of August and strengthened into a major hurricane early in September. It became the first hurricane to make landfall on Newfoundland since Igor in 2010.

Peak to late season activity
As the mid-point of the hurricane season approached, Mindy formed on September 8 and struck the Florida Panhandle shortly thereafter. It was followed by Nicholas, which developed on September 12 and made landfall along the central Texas coast two days later as a hurricane. Three tropical storms—Odette, Peter, and Rose—then formed in quick succession and were steered by prevailing winds away from any interaction with land. The busy pace of storm-formation continued late into September. Sam, a long-lived major hurricane, developed in the central tropical Atlantic and proceeded to rapidly intensify from a tropical depression to a hurricane within 24 hours on September 23 and 24. Sam peaked in strength on September 26 as a high-end Category 4 hurricane. It remained a major hurricane (Category 3 or stronger) for nearly eight consecutive days, the longest continuous stretch at that intensity for an Atlantic hurricane since Ivan, in 2004. Meanwhile, Subtropical Storm Teresa formed north of Bermuda on September 24. Short-lived Victor developed late in the month at an unusually low latitude of 8.1°N, tying Kirk in 2018 and behind only an unnamed 1902 hurricane (7.7°N) for the southernmost location in which an Atlantic system has reached tropical storm intensity.

However, tropical cyclogenesis then paused again for much of the month of October, primarily due to the presence of drier air. For the first time since 2006 and only the second time during the hyperactive era which began in 1995, no named storms developed between October 6 and October 30. Finally, Subtropical Storm Wanda formed in the central North Atlantic on October 30 and transitioned into a fully tropical storm on November 1. This system was the same storm that previously had brought rain and damaging wind gusts to southern New England as a potent nor'easter. Wanda remained a tropical cyclone until transitioning into an extratropical low on November 7, which marked the conclusion of activity during the 2021 Atlantic hurricane season.

Systems

Tropical Storm Ana 

An upper-level trough drifted across the western Atlantic on May 19, inducing the formation of a low-pressure area along a stalled front the next day. This system became co-located with an upper-level low, reducing wind shear and causing atmospheric instability, which allowed convection to develop despite cold sea surface temperatures. Ana then made counter-clockwise loop due to weak steering currents. After the wind field became more symmetrical and convection organized further by early on May 23, Ana transitioned into a tropical storm as it accelerated northeastward amid southwesterly mid-level flow. Ana peaked with maximum sustained winds of  before it encountered increasing wind shear and began losing convection. The extratropical cyclone merged with a trough early on May 24 and was then absorbed by a frontal system later that day.

On May 20, the Bermuda Weather Service issued a tropical storm watch for the precursor to Ana, before canceling it two days later.

Tropical Storm Bill

In mid-June, a cold front sagged southward across the Mid-Atlantic United States. Shower and thunderstorm activity coalesced offshore South Carolina, leading to the formation of an area of low pressure there. Though sheared, the incipient cyclone strengthened into Tropical Storm Bill twelve hours later. Banding features became better defined, especially across the northern and western quadrants of the storm, and Bill reached peak winds of  early on June 15 while paralleling the Northeast United States coastline. The low dissipated into a trough six hours later before progressing across southeastern Newfoundland.

Tropical Storm Claudette

In mid-June, a tropical wave crossed the Caribbean and eventually interacted with the enhanced portion of the monsoon trough in the East Pacific. This resulted in a large cyclonic gyre over Central America, with distinct disturbances over the East Pacific and in the Bay of Campeche. The latter system moved north, though it struggled with wind shear, resulting in a broad center with multiple swirls and winds largely confined in a rainband to the east. The cyclone weakened to a depression as it moved northeastward over Alabama, but it regained tropical storm intensity while crossing North Carolina and reached a secondary peak intensity just offshore. By June 22, Claudette was accelerating northeast and undergoing an extratropical transition, a process it completed around 06:00 UTC that day. The extratropical low dissipated on June 23 to the southeast of Nova Scotia.

The precursor Central American gyre, which also contributed to the development of Tropical Storm Dolores in the eastern Pacific, brought flooding to portions of Mexico, especially in Oaxaca, Puebla, and Veracruz. At least 400 homes in Veracruz alone suffered damage due to flooding or mudslides, while two people drowned in Chiapas. Precipitation in Louisiana peaked at  near Slidell, causing some degree of damage to 100 homes in the city. Additionally, about 100 homes in Hancock County, Mississippi, suffered water damage due to a combination of heavy rainfall and storm surge. Claudette also spawned at least nine tornadoes, four in Mississippi, three in Alabama, and one each in Georgia and North Carolina. The system caused 14 fatalities in the United States, all in Alabama, with 10 of those deaths due to a multi-vehicular accident near Montgomery. Overall, damage from Claudette in the United States was estimated at $375 million.

Tropical Storm Danny

On June 22, an upper-level trough detached from the mid-latitude jet stream. The system transitioned into an upper-level low over the subtropical central Atlantic during the next few days while trekking southwestward. Warmer waters caused convective activity to increase on June 24 while a deep-layer ridge moved the system westward. Approximately 12 hours later, the depression strengthened into Tropical Storm Danny. The cyclone rapidly weakened while moving inland, falling to tropical depression intensity just 40 minutes later. Danny dissipated over eastern Georgia early on June 29, after satellite imagery revealed that its low-level circulation was no longer well defined.

Danny became the first storm to make landfall in South Carolina in the month of June since 1867. Approximately 1,200 power outages occurred in southeastern South Carolina. Lightning damaged some structures, while windy conditions caused sporadic tree damage. Rip currents generated by the storm resulted in 10 water rescues in North Carolina. Farther inland, Danny produced heavy rainfall across portions of Metro Atlanta as it tracked across Georgia in a westward direction. Overall, the storm caused only about $5,000 in damage.

Hurricane Elsa

On June 27, a tropical wave emerged into the Atlantic from the west coast of Africa. The wave initially produced disorganized convection while tracking quickly westward, though a marked increase in convection occurred on June 30. Six hours later, the depression intensified into Tropical Storm Elsa. The storm continued westward due to a strong subtropical ridge to the north. After banding features became more defined and a small inner core developed, Elsa intensified into a hurricane on July 2.

However, the system weakened back to a tropical storm on July 3 due to its rapid forward motion at almost . Elsa's forward motion significantly slowed down by the next day, as the storm's center relocated to the east under the region with the strongest convection while passing just north of Jamaica. The storm curved north-northwestward and weakened slightly before emerging into the Gulf of Mexico early the following day. Thereafter, favorable conditions allowed Elsa to briefly re-attain hurricane status early on July 7, before wind shear and dry air entrainment weakened the system back to a tropical storm six hours later. The storm weakened after landfall, but did not fall below minimal tropical storm strength. Instead, Elsa re-intensified due to baroclinic forcing while accelerating northeastward. Elsa became an extratropical cyclone at 18:00 UTC on July 9 over eastern Massachusetts, before the remnants dissipated over Atlantic Canada on the following day.

While passing through the Windward Islands, Elsa produced sustained hurricane-force winds on Barbados, the first storm to do so since Janet in 1955. Winds downed many trees and left the entire island without electricity. The storm also damaged approximately 1,300 homes, with 62 of them completely destroyed. Additionally, Saint Vincent and the Grenadines reported damage to 43 homes and 3 police stations, while the island nation suffered significant banana crop losses. Strong winds on Saint Lucia downed a number of trees and power lines, leaving approximately 90% of electrical customers without power. Although Martinique experienced mostly minor damage, one death occurred there. In the Dominican Republic, two fatalities occurred after strong winds caused the walls of a structure to collapse. Heavy rainfall in portions of Cuba led to flooding that inundated many streets in Cienfuegos Province and isolated three towns. Elsa capsized a boat containing 22 people in the Straits of Florida, 9 of whom were never found and presumed to have drowned. In Florida, the cyclone flooded streets and downed a number of trees, especially in Key West and along the state's west coast. One death occurred in Florida. Farther inland, Elsa and its remnants produced 17 weak tornadoes between North Florida and South New Jersey. A few of them caused significant damage, including an EF1 tornado in St. Marys, Georgia, which also injured 17 people. Portions of the Northeastern United States reported wind damage and flooding, especially the New York metropolitan area. Damage in the United States totaled approximately $1.2 billion. Winds and rains generated by Elsa in Atlantic Canada left about 50,000 households without electricity, many of them in New Brunswick.

Tropical Storm Fred

Three tropical waves emerged into the Atlantic from the west coast of Africa in late July and early August. The waves slowly consolidated and organized while moving generally west-northwestward across the Atlantic. The system passed through the Leeward Islands without a well-defined center on August 10. By 00:00 UTC the next day, however, the system developed into Tropical Storm Fred over the northeastern Caribbean just south of Puerto Rico. The storm deteriorated to a tropical depression early on August 12, hours before emerging into the Atlantic off the north coast of Haiti. Fred briefly re-intensified into a tropical storm on August 13, but strong wind shear weakened it back to a tropical depression before striking Cayo Romano, Cuba, at 12:00 UTC. Land interaction then caused the system to degrade into an open trough early on August 14, but the storm began re-organizing after emerging into the Gulf of Mexico several hours later. Fred re-developed into a tropical storm over the eastern Gulf of Mexico around 12:00 UTC the next day as it headed generally northward. Fred weakened to a tropical depression over Alabama on August 17, before weakening into a remnant low over Tennessee at 00:00 UTC on August 18. The remnant low became extratropical about 24 hours later over Pennsylvania. This system persisted until dissipating over Massachusetts on August 20.

Several islands of the Lesser Antilles reported rainfall and gusty winds. Similar conditions in Puerto Rico resulted in over 13,000 customers losing electricity. In the Dominican Republic, Fred left approximately 500,000 people without electricity and 40,000 customers without power. Floods isolated 47 communities and damaged or demolished more than 800 homes, including about 100 in Santo Domingo. In Florida, storm surge caused minor coastal flooding in the Forgotten Coast region. About 40,000 customers lost electricity throughout northern Florida. One person died from a car accident due to hydroplaning in Bay County. Fred and its remnants later spawned 31 tornadoes from Georgia to Massachusetts. The storm also caused flooding as it moved farther inland, especially over western North Carolina. At least 784 businesses and homes and 23 bridges in Buncombe and Haywood counties combined were damaged or destroyed. The town of Cruso alone reported six fatalities and about $300 million in damage. Throughout the United States, Fred left seven deaths and approximately $1.3 billion in damage.

Hurricane Grace

On August 9, a tropical wave entered the Atlantic from the west coast of Africa. Although satellite imagery noted a mid-level circulation, scatterometer data indicated that the system did not have a surface circulation. Moving westward due to a subtropical ridge to the north, the depression strengthened into Tropical Storm Grace on August 14 following a significant increase in deep convection. However, dry air and the storm's quick motion caused Grace to weaken back to a tropical depression early the next day as it approached the Leeward Islands. Grace soon entered the Caribbean and initially remained weak, but the cyclone reintensified into a tropical storm on August 16.

Thereafter, Grace intensified further due to low wind shear and warm sea surface temperatures. Grace soon re-emerged into the Caribbean and intensified into a hurricane on the following day. Grace subsequently weakened to a tropical storm before emerging into the Bay of Campeche several hours later. However, the cyclone then quickly strengthened, re-attaining hurricane status at 12:00 UTC on August 20 and becoming a major hurricane about 12 hours thereafter. The system made landfall near Tecolutla, Veracruz, at 05:30 UTC. It then rapidly weakened over the mountains of central Mexico and dissipated by 18:00 UTC. However, the remnants of Grace traveled across Mexico, and contributed to the development of Tropical Storm Marty in the Eastern Pacific.

Because Grace weakened to a tropical depression before reaching the Leeward Islands, only light winds and rainfall occurred there. In the Dominican Republic, flooding damaged about 500 homes and displaced over 2,400 people. Grace also brought flooding to Haiti – especially the Sud-Est department – just days after the country experienced a devastating earthquake, which killed more than 2,200 people. Grace caused at least four fatalities occurred in Haiti, although the death toll may be higher given the short time elapsed between the storm and the earthquake. Jamaica observed sustained tropical storm-force winds, causing about 100,000 electrical customers to lose power and damaging some structures. In the Cayman Islands, tropical storm-force sustained winds and hurricane-force gusts damaged several buildings and residences and left more than 27,000 electrical customers without power on Grand Cayman alone. Grace's passage across the Yucatán Peninsula caused nearly 700,000 customers to lose electricity. High winds also downed many trees and power lines while causing minor damage to 20 schools and some other structures. The storm's second landfall in Mexico left significant impact in Hidalgo, Puebla, and Veracruz, with 110,000 homes damaged in the three states combined due to flooding, mudslides, and strong winds. Additionally, the hurricane damaged approximately 3,000 schools in Veracruz. Thirteen fatalities occurred in Mexico. Overall, Grace was responsible for 17 deaths and $513 million in damage.

Hurricane Henri

Between August 11 and August 12, a mid-level disturbance and its associated convection moved offshore the Mid-Atlantic. The system spawned a weak surface trough on August 14, which became a surface low-pressure area early the following day. Tracking southward due to a nearby mid-level high-pressure area, the depression intensified into Tropical Storm Henri about 24 hours later. Due to persistent wind shear, the center was consistently near the western edge of its convection. Late on August 18, however, Henri intensified into a high-end tropical storm as the convection organized and wrapped around the mid-level circulation center. For the next three days, Henri remained as a strong tropical storm whilst curving northwards as it rounded the western edge of the Azores High. At 12:00 UTC on August 21, Henri strengthened to a hurricane as wind shear relaxed, allowing the low-level and the mid-level circulation centers to align. After landfall, Henri rapidly weakened to a tropical depression as it made a small loop. Late on August 23, Henri degenerated into a remnant low over southeastern New York. The remnant low moved eastward and dissipated in the Atlantic east of New England on the next day.

Consequently, wind damage was mainly limited to uprooted trees. The subsequent floods in New Jersey forced the evacuation of about 200 people in Helmetta and the rescuing of almost 100 other people in Newark. In New York, heavy precipitation left waist-deep water in Brooklyn. Henri also spawned three tornadoes in Massachusetts, although each were small, weak, and short-lived, leaving minimal damage. Over 140,000 households across Connecticut, Massachusetts, New York, and Rhode Island lost electricity as a result of Henri. Altogether, the system caused an estimated $700 million in damage in the United States.

Hurricane Ida

Multiple systems, including a westward-moving tropical wave and a broad low-pressure area, began interacting in the Caribbean near the ABC islands on August 24. Convection associated with the disturbance increased and concentrated further over the next few days, resulting in the formation of a tropical depression around 12:00 UTC on August 26 just southwest of Jamaica. Six hours later, the depression intensified into Tropical Storm Ida, based on reconnaissance flight data. Moving northwestward, Ida strengthened quicker after passing the Cayman Islands, reaching hurricane status late on August 27. After crossing Cuba and entering the Gulf of Mexico, Ida entered a region of light wind shear and water temperatures exceeding , resulting in rapid intensification, with the storm strengthening to a Category 2 hurricane early on August 29 and to a Category 3 hurricane within six hours as the system cleared out a warm eye. Thereafter, Ida became a Category 4 hurricane at 12:00 UTC as it neared the Louisiana coast.

Afterward, Ida weakened slowly at first, remaining a major hurricane until early the next day. As the storm moved further inland, Ida began to rapidly weaken, falling below hurricane strength around 12:00 UTC on August 30 while turning northeastward over Mississippi, before weakening to a depression at 00:00 UTC on August 31. Ida transitioned into an extratropical cyclone over West Virginia on September 1. Thereafter, the extratropical low briefly emerged into the Atlantic, continued northeastward into Atlantic Canada, and then stalled over the Gulf of St. Lawrence before being absorbed by another low developing to its east on September 4.

As Ida's precursor tropical wave passed near the westernmost Leeward Antilles, it began to interact with a broad area of low pressure located along the northern coast of South America, triggering damaging floods and landslides across Venezuela, leading to 20 deaths. In Cuba, Ida destroyed several homes in Pinar del Río Province, contributing to the country's $250 million damage estimate. The storm caused widespread significant damage throughout coastal southeast Louisiana; parts of the New Orleans metropolitan area were left without power for several weeks. Thousands of structures suffered damage, with nearly all buildings and homes in Lafourche and Jefferson parishes sustaining some degree of impact. Damage in Louisiana alone totaled about $55 billion. Significant wind damage extended northward into southwestern Mississippi, while approximately half of Amite County lost electricity. Ida also triggered a tornado outbreak that began with numerous weak tornadoes in Mississippi, Louisiana, and Alabama. The remnants of Ida subsequently spawned several destructive tornadoes in the Northeastern United States. An EF2 tornado caused considerable damage in Annapolis, Maryland, while a low-end EF2 tornado caused significant damage in Oxford, Pennsylvania. Another EF2 tornado caused a fatality in Upper Dublin Township, Pennsylvania, before a destructive EF3 tornado heavily damaged or destroyed multiple homes in Mullica Hill, New Jersey. Additionally, severe freshwater flooding impacted thousands of structures in the Northeastern United States, causing billions of dollars in damage each in New Jersey, New York, and Pennsylvania, including the shut down of most of the transportation systems in New York City. Ida's winds, rains, storm surges, and tornadoes resulted in at least $75 billion in damages and 87 deaths throughout the United States. Of the deaths in the United States, 55 deaths were direct and 32 were indirect, while a majority of those fatalities occurred in Louisiana, New Jersey, and New York.

Tropical Storm Kate

On August 22, a tropical wave exited the west coast of Africa and entered the Atlantic. The wave, accompanied by a broad area of low pressure, moved quickly to the west and west-northward, passing well south of the Cabo Verde Islands. The depression moved generally northward and remained weak due to strong wind shear generated by a broad mid-to-upper-level trough. However, strong wind shear and very dry mid-level air caused Kate to weaken to a tropical depression on August 31. The remnants continued north-northwestward until dissipating a few days later.

Tropical Storm Julian

A tropical wave emerged into the Atlantic from the west coast of Africa on August 20. After the wave split between August 23 and August 24, its northern portion tracked northwestward toward a subtropical ridge and later northward around the ridge's western periphery. Favorable conditions such as warm sea surface temperatures and low wind shear allowed the disturbance to acquire deep convection and a low-level circulation. Early the next day, the depression attained wind speeds of a tropical storm and was named Julian. Although wind shear left convection displaced to the northeast of Julian's center, seas remained warm, allowing some intensification as the storm headed rapidly northeastward due to an approaching cold front. The remnants of Julian turned northward on August 31 and merged with a large extratropical system over the far north Atlantic later that day.

Hurricane Larry

On August 30, a strong tropical wave and an accompanying broad area of low pressure emerged off the west coast of Africa. Deep convection quickly began to increase around the eastern portion of the circulation as it moved over the far eastern tropical Atlantic. The depression intensified into Tropical Storm Larry six hours later. Located within favorable atmospheric and oceanic conditions, the cyclone steadily strengthened while moving generally westward across the Atlantic to the south of a strong mid-level ridge. A small inner-core developed late on September 1, and, by 06:00 UTC on September 2, a well-defined low- to midlevel eye feature became apparent, indicating that Larry had attained hurricane status. The storm intensified to Category 2 strength late on September 3. Then, after battling against some shear and an intrusion of dry mid-level air during an eyewall replacement cycle, Larry became a Category 3 major hurricane by 00:00 UTC on September 4. While maintaining Category 3 status for multiple days, Larry gained annular characteristics and completed two eyewall replacement cycles.

However, by September 7, the eyewall became less defined as the convection decreased. Early the next day, Larry weakened to a Category 2 hurricane as it began encountering decreasing sea surface temperatures. At 03:30 UTC on September 11, Larry made landfall in Newfoundland along the Burin Peninsula. While crossing the Labrador Sea later that day, the storm transitioned into a post-tropical cyclone, which was subsequently absorbed by a larger extratropical system by early on September 12 about halfway between Newfoundland and Greenland.

Rough surf and rip currents generated by Larry's large wind field led to five drownings, one each in the U.S. Virgin Islands, Puerto Rico, South Carolina, Florida, and Virginia. In Newfoundland, high winds uprooted many trees, knocked down power lines, and damaged some roofs. Almost 61,000 customers lost electricity, with most along the Avalon Peninsula. Damages assessed on Newfoundland were estimated at $80 million.

Tropical Storm Mindy

On August 22, a tropical wave and its associated broad low-pressure area exited the west coast of Africa and emerged into the Atlantic. The wave moved westward across the Atlantic for nearly a week, while a portion of it split-off and became Tropical Storm Kate on August 28. Thereafter, the system crossed the Caribbean and reached Central America by September 2. Part of the wave then detached again and contributed to the development of Hurricane Olaf in the eastern Pacific. The remainder of the wave moved slowly northwestward and reached the Gulf of Mexico on September 5. A burst in deep convection late on September 8 resulted in the formation of Tropical Storm Mindy over the northeastern Gulf of Mexico. Heading east-northeastward, the storm weakened to a tropical depression over southeast Georgia around 12:00 UTC and degenerated into a remnant low late on September 9 after emerging into the Atlantic. The remnant circulation merged with a baroclinic zone area on September 11.

The system which later became Mindy produced heavy rainfall in Mexico from September 2 to September 7, especially in Hidalgo, Jalisco, Mexico state, Mexico City, and Morelos. Subsequent floods damaged approximately 31,000 homes and caused at least 23 deaths across Mexico. In Hidalgo, the Rosas and Tula rivers overflowed their banks. A total of 17 fatalities occurred in Atotonilco de Tula, where more than 1,000 people evacuated, including 41 people from a flooded hospital. Damage in Mexico totaled approximately $75 million. In Florida, Mindy spawned an EF0 tornado, although it only caused minor tree damage in Wakulla County. Winds generated by the storm mainly resulted in power outages, with about 10,000 in the Florida Panhandle and a few thousand in southeast Georgia, although falling trees damaged two homes and destroyed a mobile home in Leon County, Florida. Additionally, downed trees blocked several roads in the Tallahassee metropolitan area. Throughout the United States, Mindy caused about $123,000 in damage.

Hurricane Nicholas

A tropical wave exited the west coast of Africa and emerged into the Atlantic on August 28. For several days, convection remained disorganized while the system trekked westward across the Atlantic and Caribbean. Although the wave struck Central America on September 9, a surface trough remained in the western Caribbean. The trough reached the Gulf of Mexico on September 11 and quickly developed a circulation and additional convection by the next day. With reconnaissance aircraft flights observing tropical storm-force winds, the system became Tropical Storm Nicholas around 12:00 UTC on September 12 over the Bay of Campeche. Despite warm seas and unstable atmospheric conditions, Nicholas only strengthened gradually due to moderate wind shear as it headed north-northwestward around a subtropical ridge. On September 13, a weakness in the ridge caused the cyclone to curve north-northeastward. Based on a weather station at Matagorda Bay reporting sustained hurricane-force winds, Nicholas intensified into a hurricane around 00:00 UTC on September 14. The system quickly weakened inland to tropical storm strength as it moved east-northeastward towards Galveston Bay. Around 00:00 UTC on September 15, the storm weakened to a tropical depression, approximately 18 hours prior to degenerating into a remnant low over southwestern Louisiana. The remnant low meandered over Louisiana and briefly re-emerged into the Gulf of Mexico before being absorbed by a mid-latitude trough on September 20.

In Texas, strong winds, storm surge, and abnormally high tides impacted the coast, especially in Brazoria and Matagorda counties. There, the storm downed many trees, damaged or destroyed many piers and roofs, and caused severe erosion, while wave action resulted in water entering some homes. Fort Bend, Galveston, and Harris counties experienced similar impacts but to a lesser extent. Additionally, several counties in Southeast Texas reported localized and flash flooding. At least 500,000 structures in Texas lost electricity during the storm. Numerous road closures occurred, many of them in parts of eastern Louisiana, while water entered some homes in St. Charles Parish. Further, nearly 120,000 customers lost electricity in the state. Freshwater flooding caused two deaths in Alabama. Additional fatalities occurred in Florida when rip currents swept away two people at Panama City Beach. Throughout the United States, Nicholas caused approximately $1 billion in damage.

Tropical Storm Odette

On September 11, the NHC began monitoring an area of disturbed weather over the southeastern Bahamas. As the system moved northwestward to north-northwestward, a low-pressure area formed well east of northeast Florida early on September 16. Despite the low having a relatively well-defined circulation, convection was disorganized and displaced from the center due to wind shear. Early on the following day, however, the cyclone was already beginning to lose tropical characteristics due to colder and drier air. During this process, its deep convection was consistently displaced well to the east of a poorly-defined center due to strong westerly wind shear. The system's circulation was elongated from southwest to northeast and contained multiple low-cloud swirls. The remnants of Odette retained gale-force winds and continued moving out into the central Atlantic, curving northeastward, before turning southward, making a slow counterclockwise curve. Thereafter, a strengthening ridge situated over the northwestern Atlantic caused the remnants of Odette to turn south-southeastward and later to the south-southwest. The extratropical low degenerated into a trough on September 27. During this time, the NHC monitored Odette's remnants for the potential to redevelop into a subtropical or tropical cyclone.

Tropical Storm Peter

On September 8, the NHC began monitoring a tropical wave over west Africa. The wave emerged into the Atlantic between September 13 and September 14, producing a large burst of convection but lacking a closed circulation. Moving westward, convection became more concentrated over the next few days, and by late on September 18, the system acquired a closed circulation according to a NOAA buoy and satellite imagery. Six hours later, the depression intensified into Tropical Storm Peter. As a result, Peter's low-level center was displaced west of its showers and thunderstorms. Although the NHC monitored the remnants due to the potential for redevelopment, the system dissipated well south of Newfoundland on September 29.

The system brought heavy rain showers to the northern Leeward Islands, Virgin Islands, and Puerto Rico on September 21, as it tracked to their north. This caused a few mudslides and minor flooding in some areas, including in Carolina, Corozal, Utuado, and Vega Baja. Damage on Puerto Rico totaled about $12,000.

Tropical Storm Rose

The National Hurricane Center began monitoring a tropical wave approaching the Atlantic coast of Africa on September 14. After moving into the far eastern tropical Atlantic early on September 16, the wave acquired a low-pressure center, though it remained disorganized. Despite wind shear and dry air impacting the depression's eastern quadrants, satellite images showed that the deep convection increased within the cyclone and that its overall structure continued to improve, with the system becoming Tropical Storm Rose late on September 19. However, a sharp increase in wind shear weakened the cyclone to a minimal tropical storm several hours later and to a tropical depression early the next day. The low moved northwestward until curving northward on the following day. Early on September 24, the low became an open trough.

Hurricane Sam

On September 19, a tropical wave moved off the west coast of Africa and into the Atlantic. The wave consisted of fairly concentrated convective activity as it moved westward to the south of the Capo Verde Islands on the following day. The depression intensified into Tropical Storm Sam around 06:00 UTC on September 23. Thereafter, very low wind shear and warm waters allowed Sam to reach hurricane status about 24 hours later as it tracked westward to west-northward along the eastern periphery of a mid-tropospheric anticyclone. Intensification then briefly ceased, but by 12:00 UTC on September 25, Sam reached Category 3 hurricane status. Satellite images showed a well-defined eye embedded in a developing central dense overcast, and following an increase in Dvorak intensity estimates, Sam became a Category 4 hurricane late on September 25.

However, Sam then briefly weakened to a Category 3 hurricane due to an eyewall replacement cycle and a slight increase in wind shear, before re-strengthening back to a Category 4 hurricane at 06:00 UTC on September 28. After a mid-level ridge to the storm's northeast moved eastward, Sam accelerated north-northeastward and then northward, passing east of Bermuda on October 2. Around this time, the cyclone gradually began to weaken as it tracked over cooler sea surface temperatures and fell below major hurricane intensity on the following day. Consequently, the hurricane's cloud pattern degraded on October 4 and Sam weakened to Category 1 strength around 18:00 UTC that day. Early on October 5, Sam transitioned into an extratropical cyclone well east of Newfoundland after its convective activity became asymmetrical and elongated. The extratropical low briefly executed a cyclonic loop before continuing northeastward. Early on October 7, another extratropical low absorbed the remnants of Sam to the southwest of Iceland.

Despite passing well east of Bermuda, Sam produced tropical-storm force winds on the island, although each recording site was elevated above-ground.

Subtropical Storm Teresa

A weak cold front first began pushing into the western Atlantic on September 19. As this front interacted with an upper-level low moving in from the west, it generated an area of disturbed weather, with increasing convection located near a developing surface center. As the cyclone moved northwest but then veered northeast, it encountered dry air and wind shear promptly causing it to weaken. Teresa degenerated to a remnant low around 18:00 UTC on September 25. The low weakened to a trough the next day, and that trough was absorbed by a frontal system on September 27.

Tropical Storm Victor

A vigorous tropical wave moved off Africa on September 27 and swiftly organized into a tropical depression around 12:00 UTC on September 29. The newly formed cyclone moved west-northwest on the south side of a ridge. While ocean temperatures and wind shear values were conducive, the storm was surrounded by some dry air that intermittently became entrained into its circulation. The depression intensified into Tropical Storm Victor at 18:00 UTC on September 29 and reached peak winds of  about two days later. As Victor turned northwest, it encountered starkly higher wind shear which resulted in its weakening. Its convection became displaced and its low-level circulation elongated, which led to its degeneration to a trough around 12:00 UTC on October 4. The remnants turned west and dissipated over the open Atlantic the next day.

Tropical Storm Wanda 

On October 24, the NHC began monitoring a non-tropical disturbance just off the East Coast of the United States, anticipating that it would shortly develop into a strong low-pressure system, a nor'easter, as it moved northward up the coast, and then possibly develop tropical or subtropical characteristics afterward while moving away from the coast. By 12:00 UTC on November 1, the system transitioned into a tropical storm. After meandering well west of the Azores for several days, Wanda turned southward on November 5 due to a narrow, strengthening ridge to the northwest, before accelerating northeastward late on November 6 as it interacted with a mid-level trough over the northern Atlantic.

The precursor to Wanda caused over $200 million in damages across the Northeastern United States, and two storm-related deaths were reported. Strong winds caused more than 600,000 customers to lose electricity in New England. In coastal Massachusetts, which observed hurricane-force wind gusts, numerous trees fell, damaging homes and vehicles and obstructing many roadways. Flash flooding and localized flooding also impacted several states in the region. Abnormally high tides damaged boats, necessitated water rescues, and caused coastal flooding, especially in Massachusetts and New Jersey.

Storm names

The following list of names was used for named storms that formed in the North Atlantic in 2021. This was the same list used in the 2015 season, with the exceptions of Elsa and Julian, which replaced Erika and Joaquin, respectively. The names Elsa, Julian, Rose, Sam, Teresa, Victor, and Wanda were used for the first time this year.

Retirement

On April 27, 2022, during the 44th Session of the RA IV Hurricane Committee, the World Meteorological Organization retired the name Ida from its rotating name lists due to the catastrophic damages it caused, and it will never be used again for another Atlantic hurricane. It will be replaced with Imani for the 2027 season.

Season effects

This is a table of all of the storms that formed in the 2021 Atlantic hurricane season. It includes their duration, names, intensities, areas affected, damages, and death totals. Deaths in parentheses are additional and indirect (an example of an indirect death would be a traffic accident), but were still related to that storm. Damage and deaths include totals while the storm was extratropical, a wave, or a low, and all of the damage figures are in 2021 USD.

See also

 Weather of 2021
 Tropical cyclones in 2021
 2021 Pacific hurricane season
 2021 Pacific typhoon season
 2021 North Indian Ocean cyclone season
 South-West Indian Ocean cyclone seasons: 2020–21, 2021–22
 Australian region cyclone seasons: 2020–21, 2021–22
 South Pacific cyclone seasons: 2020–21, 2021–22

Notes

References

External links

 National Hurricane Center Website
 National Hurricane Center's Atlantic Tropical Weather Outlook
 Tropical Cyclone Formation Probability Guidance Product
 Saildrone footage from inside Hurricane Sam

 
Atlantic hurricane seasons
Articles which contain graphical timelines
Tropical cyclones in 2021